Paxton House may refer to:

in Scotland
Paxton House, Berwickshire

in the United States
(by state)
Paxton House (Brookhaven, Mississippi), listed on the NRHP in Mississippi
Paxton (Powhatan, Virginia), listed on the NRHP in Virginia